Ezhava is a caste in Kerala. Shiva is a Hindu god. Siva idol was consecrated by social reformer Sree Narayana Guru at Aruvippuram, in 1888. Ezhava Siva refers not to Siva as God but to the tongue-in-cheek reply given by Sree Narayana Guru when questioned by a group of Brahmins about the legitimacy of a non Brahmin consecrating a temple. This was a major break from tradition as installation of idols by non Brahmins was considered blasphemy and Sree Narayana Guru belonged to the lower caste Ezhava community. The sarcasm was meant to highlight the immorality of Brahmins who denied social spaces and the right to worship from the lower castes.

Sree Narayana Guru, well learned in the Hindu scriptures, always considered God as a power without limits and boundaries but who bestows benevolence on all, irrespective of caste. This is evident in the Universal Prayer in Malayalam, Daivadasakam (10 Verses To God) he had written for the masses. After the Aruvippuram Temple Consecration, he wrote in Malayalam:

Consecration
Until the early 20th century, Ezhavas and other lower castes were not allowed inside Hindu temples. During Sree Narayana Guru's wandering life he came upon Aruvippuram in 1888. He decided to build a place of worship open to all castes. He picked up a stone from near by Neyyar river and used it as an idol for the proposed temple and consecrated it.

This act challenged Brahmin hegemony. When Brahmin priests questioned his right to do so, he replied famously that what he installed was an "Ezhava Siva". He further asked whether the universal power belonged to any caste. He set up other temples at Aluva, Vypin, Cherai and Moothakunnam.

Legacy
Narayana Guru's actions are widely acknowledged to have paved way for later movements by lower castes for temple entry, including the ‘Vaikom Satyagraha’. 125th Anniversary of Aruvippuram installation was celebrated in 2013.

References

See also
 Narayana Guru

Shiva temples in Kerala